Gordon Hudson Vejprava (born May 3, 1933) is a Canadian former professional hockey player who played for the Cleveland Barons and Providence Reds in the American Hockey League. He also played for the Marion Barons and Toledo Mercurys in the International Hockey League, and the Calgary Stampeders, Vancouver Canucks, Los Angeles Blades, and Denver Spurs of the Western Hockey League.

External links
 

1933 births
Living people
Canadian ice hockey centres
Denver Spurs (WHL) players
Canadian expatriate ice hockey players in the United States